Giovanni Scialpi, best known as Scialpi or Shalpy (born 14 May 1962) is an Italian pop singer, active from the early  eighties of the 20th century.

Background 
Born in Parma, Scialpi had an immediate success in the Summer of 1983 with the song "Rocking Rolling". Considered a sex symbol, in the 1980s he amassed several domestic hits, alternating romantic ballads (such as "Cigarettes and Coffee") and upbeat songs marked by futuristic lyrics (such as the cited "Rocking Rolling" and "No East No West", with whom he entered the competition at the 1986 Sanremo Music Festival). In 1988 he won the Festivalbar with the song "Pregherei". Since the 1990s he gradually slowed down his production although he never dropped out from music altogether.

Scialpi also appeared as an actor in an episode of the TV series Derrick and starred on several stage musicals.  In 1990 he co-hosted the variety television Ricomincio da due together with Raffaella Carrà.

In 2012 he changed his stage name to Shalpy.

In July 2015 he announced his marriage with Roberto Blasi, an actor. They had been in a relationship since 2009.

In September 2015 he took part to the fourth Italian edition of Pechino Express.

Discography

Selected singles

″Rocking Rolling″  (1983)
″Mi manchi tu″ (1983)
″Cigarettes and Coffee″  (1984)
″No East No West″  (1986)
″Cry″ (1986)
″Bella età″  (1987)
″Pregherei″  (with Scarlett, 1988)
″Il grande fiume″  (1990)
″A... amare″  (1991)
″È una nanna″   (1992)
″Baciami″  (1994)
″Che per amore fai″  (1995)
″Bella signora″  (1998)
″La creazione″  (2001)
″Sono quel ragazzo″  (2002)
″Pregherò Imparerò Salverò″  (2003)
″Non ti amo più″  (2005)
″Goodbye″  (2006)
″I believe I can fly″  (2011)
″Here I am″  (2011)
″Ilventocaldodellestate″(2012)
″Icon-man″ (2012)
″Music is Mine″ (2013)
″Came to Me″ (2014)

Studio albums

Es-tensioni (1983)
Animale (1984)
Scialpi (1986)
Yo soy el amor (1987)
Un morso e via (1988)
Trasparente (1990)
Neroe (1991)
360 gradi (1992)
XXX (1994)
Spazio 1995 (1995)
Scialpi (2000)
Spingi, invoca, ali (2003)
Autoscatto (2006)
Liberi e Romantici (2011)

References

External links
 

1962 births
Musicians from Parma
Italian pop singers
Italian male actors
Living people
Italian LGBT singers
Italian rock singers
Italian Italo disco musicians
English-language singers from Italy
Participants in Italian reality television series
ZYX Music artists